Eupithecia variostrigata is a moth in the family Geometridae. It is widespread in the western Palearctic realm, ranging from Spain to the western Pamirs in the east.

Subspecies
Eupithecia variostrigata variostrigata
Eupithecia variostrigata artemesiata Constant, 1884
Eupithecia variostrigata constantina Bethune-Baker, 1885
Eupithecia variostrigata designata Dietze, 1913

References

External links

Lepiforum.de

Moths described in 1876
variostrigata
Moths of Europe
Moths of Asia